Lynn Turner may refer to:

 Lynn Turner (murderer) (1968–2010), American convicted murderer
 Lynn Turner (model) (born 1935), American Playboy model
 Joe Lynn Turner (born 1951), American rock singer